Antennaria is a genus of beetles in the family Cicindelidae, containing the following species:

 Antennaria crassicornis Macleay, 1888
 Antennaria doddi Sloane, 1905
 Antennaria ioscelis Hope, 1841
 Antennaria sparsimpilosa Horn, 1913

References

Cicindelidae